Cosmetic surgery, also referred to as aesthetic surgery, is a surgical procedure which endeavours to improve the physical aspects of one's appearance to become more aesthetically pleasing. It is closely linked to plastic surgery, but cosmetic surgery focuses more on the improvement of one's appearance, for example by reducing the signs of aging, instead of existing for health purposes. Motivation for plastic surgery has been debated throughout Korean society. Holliday and Elfving-Hwang suggest that the pressure of success in work and marriage is deeply rooted in the one's ability to manage their body which is influenced by beauty. As companies helping with matchmaking for marriage and even job applications require a photo of the individual, it is inevitable that the Korean population feels pressure to undergo plastic surgery to achieve the "natural beauty". According to ISESP data as of 2021, South Korea has estimated the highest number of plastic surgery cases per capita in the world.

History
The modern Korean interest in appearance dates back to the 7th century, finding its roots in physiognomy (gwansang). The concept of connecting identity and appearance became stronger during the Japanese colonial period in Korea, as Japanese rulers believed that certain facial features displayed greater intelligence and nobility. After that, plastic surgery technique brought by American doctors during the Korean War and accepted the Western notion that changing one's face would change one's destiny.

Due to the 1997 Asian financial crisis, which also had a lot of impact on South Korea, the country introduced large reforms which forcibly introduced a privatised free market in the country. This resulted in a lot of labor laws disappearing, making it easier for companies to fire their employees. Due to the unemployment crisis, Korean citizens tried all they could to get an edge over competitors for a job position, including cosmetic surgery. This still happens in the current day, as companies require a photo, height, and sometimes the family background of applicants as a part of the hiring process.

Statistics 
Throughout the years plastic surgery has become more accepted in Korea as a whole, the question "can a woman get plastic surgery for marriage" was agreed with by just 38% in 1994, but a major 66% in 2015. In the same survey, the amount of women that had plastic surgery climbed from 5% in 1994 to 31% in 2015. Women consistently score higher and are more supportive about the procedures than men. According to a Statista survey in 2020 which interviewed a total of 1500 people, plastic surgery is way prevalent among young women in South Korea. Nearly 25% of women aged 19–29 have undergone plastic surgery, while men have only undergone surgery 2% of the times. This number increases to 31% of women and 4% of men among 30–39-year-olds.

South Korea is frequently called the "plastic surgery capital of the world". Cosmetic surgery in South Korea is not stigmatised and is even a common graduation gift. South Korea's cosmetic surgery is a market leader, with South Korea taking a 25% share in the global market. One in five Korean women have undergone plastic surgery, compared to just one in twenty in the United States. In 2018, a total of 464,452 patients visited South Korea for cosmetic surgery, a 16.7 percent increase from 2017.

Market 
In the Korean surgery market, there are two providers: Hospitals and Specialty Clinics and Spas and Cosmetic Surgery Centers. In 2021, the market was valued to 1.95 billion US dollars.

Forms of cosmetic surgery

Blepharoplasty 

This form of cosmetic surgery is also known as the "double eyelid surgery". It is a surgery that reshapes the skin around the eye, resulting in a crease on the upper eyelid. The procedure is not just popular in South Korea, but also other Asian countries like Taiwan and India.

The double eyelid surgery can be done in several ways, with the main difference being the form of incision. The full incision is often done to patients with excess fat and skin in the upper eyelid, a partial incision is done when there is only excess fat in the eyelid, while there is no incision used when there is no excess fat and skin. The surgery is not considered painful and it can take up to 4 weeks to fully recover.

Cheekbones 
A cheekbone surgery, also known as the Asian Facial Skeletal Contouring surgery, is often done to reduce the size of the cheeks and jaw to create a V-shaped jawline. Modern K-pop groups like Wonder Girls and Girls' Generation have created a trend for the V-shaped face among young girls, as it is seen as an attractive feature of K-pop idols. The surgery for a V-line jaw is done by removing sections of the jawbone and jaw, but also by reducing the fat in the cheeks to make the face look thinner.

There are several versions of this procedure; a zygomatic reduction, a V-Line surgery, and mandibular contouring. The surgery is considered mildly painful and the face can swell for several days after surgery. A zygomatic reduction is done by changing the shape of the cheekbone, the zygomatic arch is fractured during surgery and part of the bone is shaved down to reduce the outward position. The V-Line surgery is done through the mouth and surgically decreases the width and height of the jaw by shaving off part of the bone. Mandibular contouring is similar, but instead of reconstructing the jawline shape like in the V-Line surgery, it shaves off part of the existing jawline to give it a more feminine appearance.

Rhinoplasty 

This surgery is done by doing an incision in the columella, this makes it easy to restructure the nose, once the procedure is done, it takes a few weeks to heal completely. This procedure is not always done as a cosmetic surgery, as restructuring the nose can also make it easier to breathe. Examples of Korean celebrities that have gone through this procedure include Kim Hee-chul, Jessi, and Soyou.

There is two ways to do the procedure, which are open and closed. The open surgery is the most popular as it gives the surgeon more visual context. It affects the columella, which often heals without any issues and leaves a minor scar that should be very difficult to spot. In a closed surgery, all the incisions are made inside of the nose.

In South Korea, rhinoplasty is the second least common surgery among ethnic Koreans; however it is the most common procedure performed on women of European and Middle Eastern descent, who often seek to have their noses reduced in size.

Face whitening 

Face-whitening injections have also started becoming more popular as a pale skin fits within the Korean beauty standards. The active ingredients in these injections is glutathione, the procedure last 20 minutes. Some negative effects from the procedure are as following: low blood pressure, rash all over the body, and some problems with digestive system like nausea or vomiting. A lot of the skincare products in Asia feature face whitening chemicals like mercury, which is known to have bad health effects.

Medical tourism 
Medical tourism is the act of attracting foreigners to undergo surgeries. With the rise of popularity of K-drama and K-pop around the world, numerous people opted South Korea to undergo cosmetic surgeries. "South Korea's plastic surgery business is gaining popularity because of the country's quick, affordable, efficient, safe, and high-quality healthcare system." In 2019, a total of 211,218 tourists visited South Korea for plastic surgery.

Controversy

Ghost surgeries 

A ghost surgery is a surgery in which the person who performs the operation, the "ghost doctor," is not the surgeon that was hired for and is credited with the operation. The ghost doctor substitutes the hired surgeon while the patient is unconscious from anesthesia. 

Ghost surgeries are "rampant" in the South Korean cosmetic surgery industry. Ghost doctors are often unlicensed and unqualified to perform the operations they are hired for, with some plastic surgeries being performed by dentists, nurses, or salespeople; one former ghost doctor reported that most substitutes were dentists. The Korean Society of Plastic Surgeons estimated that there were about 100,000 victims of ghost surgery in South Korea between 2008 and 2014. About five patients died during ghost surgeries between 2014 and 2022.

Ghost surgery is illegal in South Korea, but as there is often no evidence a surgery was performed by a ghost doctor, it is rarely punished in court. Public backlash to ghost surgery has led to the mandating of security cameras in operating rooms in South Korea.

Beauty Standards 

Korea is often criticised for having unrealistic beauty standards, often expecting women to be very thin to the point where their weight can become unhealthy. The "escape the corset" movement goes directly against the country's beauty standards and active promotion of beauty products and surgery. The movement is intended to create body positivity and reduce the strict standards that women have to live up to in the country.

A study made by Charlotte N. Markeya and Patrick M. Markeya show there is a correlation between reality television viewing and interest in cosmetic surgery.

Another study made by Young A. Kim, Duckhee Chae and Hyunlye Kim about  "Factors Affecting Acceptance of Cosmetic Surgery Among Undergraduate Students" affirms that the rise of the beauty standards conveyed by television, internet, actors and stars of K-pop affect people's mental health by decreasing their self-esteem and increasing their anxiety. The socio-cultural message transmitted by peers reflects the high beauty standards are became the norms.

A study at Miami University shows that the pressure to get the "perfect" appearance can stem from feelings of inferiority if someone sees themselves as less attractive.

Let Me In was a controversial South Korean television show that is focused on doing complete make-overs, including plastic surgery. Participants have to convince a panel that their appearance makes their life difficult, it even goes as far as making their parents apologise for appearance and lack of plastic surgery. Participants are presented to the audience after their make-over. The show was shut down in 2015 in a response to the amount of controversy and criticism, as the show was blamed for making plastic surgery more attractive to its viewers.

Employment surgery 
Employment surgery is a common occurrence in South Korea. Due to a lot of competition in the job market, appearance is considered an important factor when hiring, which pressures people into undergoing surgery to get an edge over their competitors. People often come across appearance discrimination when trying to find a job in South Korea, further normalising plastic surgery to get the job you want. People who are considered more appealing have statistically more chances to "have" the job than people who does not fit the beauty standards. This is well known by Koreans and can affect also the mental health of person who are looking for a job with the required qualification but not does not satisfy the beauty qualification. According to a 2006 survey, 92.2% of women in South Korea expect to be discriminated based on appearance during a job interview.

In 2021, a bill was proposed that take action against this culture, banning companies from asking for photos at a résumé. A survey in 2006 showed that 80% of public companies require personal information like photos.

See also 
 Cosmetics in Korea
 Cosmetic surgery in Australia
 Cosmetic surgery in China
 Korean beauty standards
 Medical tourism in South Korea

References 

Cosmetic surgery
Society of South Korea
Healthcare in South Korea